Emil Rachev (Bulgarian: Емил Рачев; 9 April 1990 – 27 August 2018) was a Bulgarian footballer who played as a midfielder.

Career
On 23 November 2009 Rachev made his professional debut for Beroe Stara Zagora in A Group in match against Minyor Pernik.

On 30 June 2017, after a season and half in Rozova Dolina Kazanlak and scoring 35 goals in 45 matches, he rejoined in Neftochimic Burgas in Bulgarian Second Professional League. Rachev suffered an injury during pre-season and was released in September without making a single appearance for the team.

Rachev died in his sleep on 27 August 2018 from a heart attack, just a few hours after a league match with Rozova Dolina Kazanlak 
in Third League.

References

External links
 

1990 births
2018 deaths
People from Kazanlak
Bulgarian footballers
PFC Beroe Stara Zagora players
Neftochimic Burgas players
FC Pomorie players
Académica Petróleos do Lobito players
First Professional Football League (Bulgaria) players
Second Professional Football League (Bulgaria) players
Bulgarian expatriate footballers
Expatriate footballers in Angola
Association football midfielders